Stephen Rahman-Hughes (born 26 January 1970) is an English–Malaysian actor and singer. He is known for his roles as DCI Vikesh Dasari in the ITV soap opera Emmerdale and Adam Bateman in the BBC soap opera EastEnders.

Career 
In 2006, Rahman-Hughes starred as Hang Tuah in the Malaysian musical production of Puteri Gunung Ledang. Later in 2006, Rahman-Hughes made his television debut in the Sky One drama series Dream Team. In 2007, he became a vocalist in a male opera group, Teatro.

In 2011, Rahman-Hughes became the lead actor of Malaysian film Hikayat Merong Mahawangsa. In August 2018, he joined EastEnders as Adam Bateman, a dentist.  It was announced on 28 September 2019 that his character was axed from the show. Adam’s final episode aired on 3 December 2019.

Filmography

References

External links

Living people
British male actors of Asian descent
English people of Malaysian descent
English male television actors
Male actors from London
English male musical theatre actors
English people of Malay descent
English people of Welsh descent
1970 births